Cherish the Day is an American romantic drama anthology television series created and produced by Ava DuVernay. The series chronicles the relationship of one couple, with each episode spanning a single day marking a significant moment. The full first season of eight episodes took place over the course of five years. 

The series premiered on February 11, 2020, on Oprah Winfrey Network. Season one starred Xosha Roquemore, Alano Miller and Cicely Tyson, and the title references the Sade song "Cherish the Day". Co-star Cicely Tyson died on January 28, 2021, at the age of 96; this was her final television role.

On October 26, 2020, the series was renewed for a second season. It was announced in July 2021 that Joy Bryant and Henry Simmons would star in the second season. Season 2 premiered on October 4, 2022.

Cast

Main
Xosha Roquemore as Gently James (season 1)
Alano Miller as Evan Fisher (season 1) 
Cicely Tyson as  Miss Luma Lee Langston (season 1)
Joy Bryant as Sunday St. James (season 2)
Henry Simmons as Ellis Moran (season 2)
Terri J. Vaughn as Anastasia (season 2)
Richard Roundtree as Mandeville "MV" St. James (season 2)

Recurring
Michael Beach as Ben
Anne-Marie Johnson as Marilyn Fisher
Kellee Stewart as Ellene
Dorien Wilson as Johnny Fisher
Beau Billingslea as Pastor Gordon

Episodes

Series overview

Season 1: Gently & Evan (2020)

Season 2: Sunday & Ellis (2022)

References

External links

2020 American television series debuts
2020s American anthology television series
2020s American drama television series
2020s American romance television series
American romantic drama television series
English-language television shows
Oprah Winfrey Network original programming
Television series by Harpo Productions
Television series by Warner Horizon Television
Television shows set in Los Angeles